Stephen "Steve" Crowe (born 20 April 1969) is an Australian former rugby league footballer who played in the 1990s.  Crowe played for the Newcastle Knights in the National Rugby League.

Background
Crowe was born in Young, New South Wales.

Playing career
Crowe played his entire career at the Knights. He played in the Knight's first premiership winning team in 1997, a game which has been described as one of the best grand finals on record. His career ended prematurely after a series of serious injuries, including a broken sternum in his final year (1998).

Post playing
After his playing career finished, he went on to enjoy an off-field career with the club in a number of marketing and management roles. He is a republican, having been a member of the Australian Republican Movement's (ARM) NSW Committee in the lead-up to the 1999 republican referendum. He also led the Hunter Region branch of the ARM during that period.

References

1969 births
Living people
Australian republicans
Australian rugby league players
Newcastle Knights players
Rugby league players from Young, New South Wales